Robert Bruce Spencer (born 1962) is an American anti-Muslim author and blogger, and one of the key figures of the counter-jihad movement. His published books include two New York Times bestsellers.

In 2003 he founded and has since directed a blog that tracks what he considers Islamic extremism, known as Jihad Watch. He co-founded the anti-Muslim group Stop Islamization of America with blogger and far-right conspiracy theorist Pamela Geller. Reports that two of Spencer's books were listed in FBI training materials and that he had given seminars to various law enforcement units in the United States stirred controversy. He has frequently appeared on Fox News.  In 2013 the UK Home Office barred Spencer from travel to the UK for three to five years for "making statements  that may foster hatred that might lead to inter-community violence".

Background
Spencer was baptized in the Greek Orthodox Church and joined the Melkite Greek Catholic Church in 1984. In a 2006 interview, Spencer stated that, under the reign of President Mustafa Kemal Ataturk, his grandparents were forced to emigrate from an area that is now part of Turkey because they were Christians. According to a 2010 interview in New York magazine, Spencer's father worked for Voice of America during the Cold War, and in his younger days, Spencer himself worked at Revolution Books, a Maoist bookstore in New York City founded by Robert Avakian.

Spencer received an M.A. in 1986 in religious studies from the University of North Carolina at Chapel Hill. His masters thesis was on monophysitism and the history of the Catholic Church.

Career
Spencer has been studying Islamic theology, law, and history since 1980, but his publications on Islam and Muslims have not undergone academic peer review. They have been published by publishing houses that specialize in the writings of political conservatives – mostly Regnery Publishing or Bombardier Books. He worked in think tanks for more than 20 years, and in 2002–2003 was an adjunct fellow with the Free Congress Foundation.

Spencer has been harshly criticized by several clergies of the Roman Catholic Church because of his views on Islam. In 2016, as a result of "personal reflection and historical study", Spencer became an ex-Catholic and returned to the Greek Orthodox Church.

An October 2010 investigative report by The Tennessean described Spencer as one of several individuals who "... cash in on spreading hate and fear about Islam." The Tennessean investigation concluded: "IRS filings from 2008 show that Robert Spencer earned $132,537 from the David Horowitz Freedom Center, and Horowitz pocketed over $400,000 for himself in just one year."

On June 26, 2013, both Spencer and Pamela Geller were banned from entering the UK. They were due to speak at an English Defence League march in Woolwich, south London, where Drummer Lee Rigby was killed. Home Secretary Theresa May informed Spencer and Geller that their presence in the UK would "not be conducive to the public good". A letter from the UK Home Office stated that this decision is based on Spencer's statement that Islam "is a religion or a belief system that mandates warfare against unbelievers for the purpose of establishing a societal model that is absolutely incompatible with Western society. ...Because of media and general government unwillingness to face the sources of Islamic terrorism, these things remain largely unknown."

The decision was to stand for between three and five years. The ban followed a concerted campaign by the UK anti-racism organization Hope not Hate, which said it had collected 26, 000 signatures for a petition to the Home Secretary. Spencer and Geller contested the ban, but in 2015 the British Court of Appeals dismissed the appeal, arguing  that "this was a public order case where the police had advised that significant public disorder and serious violence might ensue from the proposed visit."

The ban was criticized by Douglas Murray. He has stated his belief that because Islamic supremacist hate preachers were and are still allowed to enter the UK, and because what Geller and Spencer say is much less objectionable than the views and statements of extremist Muslim clerics such as Muhammad al-Arefe (who was allowed to enter the UK shortly before Spencer and Geller were banned), the ban is unjust.

The government of Pakistan banned Spencer's book, The Truth About Muhammad, in 2016, citing "objectionable material" as the cause. Onward Muslim Soldiers was banned in Malaysia in 2007.

On April 13, 2017, Spencer spoke at Truman State University despite protests and a petition against him. He was invited by the Young America's Foundation. On May 1, 2017, Spencer spoke at the University of Buffalo. There he was shouted down and heckled. On May 3, 2017, Spencer spoke at Gettysburg College; 375 alumni urged the college president Janet Morgan Riggs to cancel the speech, but the event went on as planned. Spencer said, "There is one kind of diversity that is not valued generally in an academic setting and that is intellectual diversity." On November 14, 2017, Spencer spoke at Stanford University. Many students walked out during the event.

Spencer has claimed that "a young Icelandic Leftist" poisoned him in 2017 in Reykjavik, Iceland.

Influence and criticism
Spencer is known for his anti-Muslim views. He comments on radical Islam, Islamic extremism, Islamic terrorism, and Islamic supremacism. According to author Todd H. Green, Spencer's commentary on Islam has been regarded as "hav[ing] made a huge impact on the misinformation about Islam that circulates so freely on the Internet, in the media, and in political circles."

Spencer's 2008 book Stealth Jihad: How Radical Islam is Subverting America without Guns or Bombs has been seen to have developed one of the most important ideas of the counter-jihad, namely the "stealth jihad" idea that "terrorists aren’t America’s real Muslim problem", writing that "distracted by foreign wars and the prospect of domestic terror attacks, Americans pay little heed to the true agents of intolerance in their midst", namely the Muslim Brotherhood and its alleged offshoots such as CAIR and MPAC.

Spencer co-founded the anti-Muslim group Stop Islamization of America (also known as the American Freedom Defense Initiative) with Pamela Geller in 2010. The organization is designated as a hate group by the Anti-Defamation League and the Southern Poverty Law Center. He and Geller led a campaign to stop the building of Park51, an Islamic community center near the World Trade Center, which they referred to as the "Ground Zero Mosque".

In July 2011, Wired reported that two of Spencer's books were listed in FBI training materials. Both The Truth About Muhammad and The Politically Incorrect Guide to Islam were recommended for agents hoping to better understand Islam.

The perpetrator of the 2011 Norway attacks, Anders Breivik, cited Robert Spencer 64 times in his manifesto and wrote of him: "About Islam I recommend essentially everything written by Robert Spencer." Spencer condemned Breivik and said he was unfairly blamed by the media for the attack.

He released a second book in 2021, Islamophobia and The Threat to Free Speech, in which Spencer argued that America and the larger Western world was primed and prepared to surrender its free speech under the threat of “Islamophobia”.

In 2012, Spencer released Did Muhammad Exist? that questions whether there is any historical evidence that the prophet of Islam actually existed.

Bibliography

Best sellers
 The Truth About Muhammad: Founder of the World's Most Intolerant Religion, Regnery Press, 2006 (NYT bestseller list – 2006-10-29)  
 The Politically Incorrect Guide to Islam (And the Crusades), Regnery Press, 2005. (NYT bestseller list – 2005-10-16)

Other books

 
 
 
 
 
 
 
 
 downloadable version
 
 
 
 The Myth of Islamic Tolerance: How Islamic Law Treats Non-Muslims (editor), Prometheus Books, 2005.  
 Onward Muslim Soldiers: How Jihad Still Threatens America and the West, Regnery Publishing, 2003.  
 
 
 downloadable version

See also

 A Common Word Between Us and You
 Catholic–Muslim Forum

References

External links

1962 births
American bloggers
Living people
American anti-communists
American political writers
American male non-fiction writers
American social commentators
Counter-jihad activists
Christian critics of Islam
Middle Eastern Christians
University of North Carolina at Chapel Hill alumni
21st-century American non-fiction writers
Converts to Eastern Catholicism from Eastern Orthodoxy
Converts to Eastern Orthodoxy from Catholicism
Greek Orthodox Christians from the United States
American male bloggers
American conspiracy theorists